Stationers' Crown Woods Academy is a coeducational secondary school and sixth form with academy status, located in the Eltham area of the Royal Borough of Greenwich in London, England. The school is built upon the land that was formerly King Henry VIII's hunting grounds (hence 'Crown Woods').

First known as Crown Woods School, the school was founded in 1958. It was reopened in new £50 million buildings designed by Nicholas Hare Architects in 2011 and was renamed Crown Woods College. In 2014 the school was renamed Stationers' Crown Woods Academy after the school gained academy status and joined the Leigh Academies Trust, the first Leigh academy outside Kent.

The school also featured in BBC series Tough Young Teachers as two trainee teachers went to the school to learn on the job.

History
At one point Crown Woods was the largest comprehensive school in London with 2600 pupils.

Between 1964 and 1985 or later the school had a boarding section for 120 children, mainly of serving Forces personnel, called The Lodge.

In 2000, Crown Woods was identified by Ofsted as a "failing school". The school was critical of the cursory inspections Ofsted had made to come to this judgement, and challenged it in court. In a humiliating 11th-hour climbdown, Ofsted agreed to an out-of-court settlement  which spared it the embarrassment of a public hearing. Ofsted was ordered to pay the school's costs - estimated to run into five figures - as well as lifting its judgment. The chief inspector Chris Woodhead retired.

Structure
It is structured into four 'home schools', each in separate buildings. The scheme received a RIBA London Award in 2012 and was commended at the Civic Trust Awards the same year. Three of the schools are for pupils aged 11 to 16 and pupils are allocated to the schools based on ability, skills and interests. The fourth school is a dedicated sixth form centre for 16- to 18-year-old students.

Previously a community school governed by Greenwich London Borough Council, Crown Woods College converted to academy status on 1 September 2014 and was renamed Stationers' Crown Woods Academy. The school is part of the Leigh Academies Trust and is sponsored by the Worshipful Company of Stationers and Newspaper Makers.

Curriculum
Stationers' Crown Woods Academy offers GCSEs, BTECs and vocational courses as programmes of study for pupils, while students in the sixth form have the option of studying from a range of A Levels as well as further BTECs, GNVQs, and other vocational courses.

Headteachers
 Malcolm Ross
 Cyril Davis
 Peter Wells
 Linda Neal
 Michael Murphy 
 David Miller
 Wayne Barnett

Notable former pupils
Sadik Balarabe, professional footballer
 Helen Mountfield, King's Counsel and Principal of Mansfield College, Oxford
 Ed Mountfield, Vice-President for Operations Policy and Country Services, World Bank
Michael Turner, former Sunderland and Norwich City defender
Laura Weir, Editor in Chief of ES Magazine, The London Evening Standard
Eoin Ó Broin Sinn Féin politician 
Michael Wren Landlord of The Long Pond Public House, the first on-licence premises on the Corbett Estate in Eltham Park

References

External links
 

Secondary schools in the Royal Borough of Greenwich
Academies in the Royal Borough of Greenwich
Arson in the 1970s
Leigh Academies Trust
Buildings and structures in Eltham
Recipients of Civic Trust Awards
Educational institutions established in 1958
School buildings in the United Kingdom destroyed by arson
1958 establishments in England